The Northern Maine Museum of Science is a natural history museum in Presque Isle, Maine. Located on the campus of the University of Maine at Presque Isle, it was founded in the early 1970s when Leroy Norton, an Aroostook County naturalist donated a significant number of pieces, including sea shells and local forestry examples. It expanded again in the 1970s when it received a large portion of the defunct Portland Museum of Natural History. It is located in Folsom Hall on the UMPI campus.  Exhibit topics include biology, mathematics, physical science, astronomy, chemistry, geology, forestry and agriculture.

References

External links
 Northern Maine Museum of Science - official site

Museums in Aroostook County, Maine
Buildings and structures in Presque Isle, Maine
University of Maine at Presque Isle
University museums in Maine
Natural history museums in Maine
Science museums in Maine